Muxton is a village between Lilleshall and Donnington in Shropshire, England. It now forms part of the new town of Telford, situated on the town's very north-eastern outskirts.

The population was 6,557 as of the 2011 Census, which is a 12.6% increase over that at the previous census, which took place in 2001.

The village is home to a doctors' surgery, a pharmacy, a post office, fast food outlets, a Price-point retailer, a hotel, a primary school and park areas.

There is a McDonald's, a petrol station, a Premier Inn and a restaurant located between Muxton and neighbouring Donnington.

St John's Church, (Church of England), is located in Muxton and together with St. Michael's and all Angels in Lilleshall forms the centre of the Christian community in both parishes. The building of St. John's is also used as a small community centre.  There is also the Serbian Orthodox Church's Church of Saint Nicholas.

The Shropshire Golf Centre is near Muxton, situated within the Granville Country Park, which itself lies on the southern edge of the greater Muxton area.

See also
Listed buildings in Lilleshall and Donnington

References

External links

 St John's Church
 Adrian Lawrence Local Councillor for Muxton

Villages in Shropshire
Telford